The prime minister of the Bahamas is the head of government of the Bahamas. The prime minister is formally appointed into office by the governor-general of the Bahamas, who represents Charles III, the king of the Bahamas (the Bahamian head of state).

The following article contains a list of prime ministers of the Bahamas, from the establishment of the position of chief minister of the Bahama Islands in 1955 to the present day.

Constitutional basis
Under section 72 of the constitution of the Bahamas, the governor-general of the Bahamas must appoint "the member of the House of Assembly who is the leader of the party which commands the support of the majority of the members of that House". In the event of a hung parliament, the governor-general should appoint the member who is "most likely to
command the support of the majority of members of that House".

Official oath of office

Office of the Prime Minister
The prime minister of the Bahamas is the head of the government of the Bahamas. The duties of the prime minister include:
 Office of the Prime Minister
 Department of Lands and Surveys
 Government Printing Department
 Department of Statistics
 Bahamas Information Services
 National Economic Council
 Promotion and facilitation of investment
 Development in the Family Islands

Agencies under the prime minister include:
 Department of Lands and Surveys
 Lands and Surveying
 Acquiring Land

 Department of Local Government
 Relations with Local Government Agencies
 Local improvement associations

List of heads of government of the Bahamas (1955–present)

Chief minister of the Bahama Islands (1955–1964)

Premiers of the Bahama Islands (1964–1969)

Prime minister of the Commonwealth of the Bahama Islands (1969–1973)

Prime ministers of the Commonwealth of the Bahamas (1973–present)

Deputy prime ministers 
Arthur Dion "A.D" Hanna 1967–1984
Clement T. Maynard 1985–1992
Orville Turnquest 1992–1995
Frank Watson 1995–2002
Cynthia A. Pratt 2002–2007
Brent Symonette 2007–2012
Philip Davis 2012–2017
Peter Turnquest 2017–2020
Desmond Bannister 2020–2021
Chester Cooper 2021–present

See also
Governor-General of the Bahamas
Lists of office-holders
 List of prime ministers of Elizabeth II
 List of Commonwealth heads of government
 List of Privy Counsellors (1952–2022)

References

http://www.rulers.org/rulb1.html#bahamas
https://web.archive.org/web/20041017033939/http://www.hk-bahamas.de/en/parties.php
http://www.politicalresources.net/bahamas.htm
Guinness Book of Kings Rulers & Statesmen, Clive Carpenter, Guinness Superlatives Ltd

 
Bahamas
Heads of government
Bahamas